Zahorna may refer to several places:

Zahorna, a village in Chițcani Commune, Căușeni district, Moldova
Zahorna, a village in Dobrușa Commune, Șoldănești district, Moldova
Zahorna (Cracău), a tributary of the river Cracău in Neamț County, Romania
Zahorna, a tributary of the river Bistrița in Neamț County, Romania